was a bi-weekly Japanese seinen manga magazine published by Kodansha from 2001 to 2023. Circulation was reported by the Japan Magazine Publishers Association at 115,617 copies in 2015.

The magazine ended publication on February 28, 2023, and some titles being serialized in the magazine were moved to Kodansha's Comic Days website.

List of serialized manga

2000s 
 Koi Kaze by Motoi Yoshida (2001–2004)
 Sakuran by Moyoco Anno (2001–2003)
 Scout Seishirō by Norifusa Mita (2001–2003)
 Mister Ajikko II by Daisuke Terasawa (2003–2012)
 Moyasimon: Tales of Agriculture by Masayuki Ishikawa (2004–2013, moved to )
 Shamo by Izo Hashimoto (story) and Akio Tanaka (art) (2004–2015, moved from Manga Action)
 Yugo the Negotiator by Shinji Makari (story) and Shuu Akana (art) (2004–2015)
 Blood Alone by Masayuki Takano (2005–2014)
 Garōden by Baku Yumemakura (story) and Keisuke Itagaki (art) (2005–2010, moved from Young Magazine Uppers)
 Yama Onna Kabe Onna by Atsuko Takakura (2005–2010)
 You're Being Summoned, Azazel by Kubo Yasuhisa (2007–2018)
 All-Rounder Meguru by Hiroki Endo (2008–2016)
 Moteki by Mitsurō Kubo (2008–2010)
 Captain Alice by Yuzo Takada (2009–2013)
 Noririn by Mohiro Kitoh (2009–2015)
 Tōmei Axle by Norifusa Mita (2009–2010)

2010s 
 Ōgari by Sachiko Aoki (2010–2011)
 Yoiko no Mokushiroku by Kei Aoyama (2010–2011)
 Aventurier by Takashi Morita (2011–2013)
 Battle Angel Alita: Last Order by Yukito Kishiro (2011–2014, moved from Ultra Jump)
 Boys Be… Adult Season by Masahiro Itabashi (story) and Hiroyuki Tamakoshi (art) (2011–2013)
 Hitsuji no Ki by Tatsuhiko Yamagami (story) and Mikio Igarashi (art) (2011–2014)
 Lovely Muco by Takayuki Mizushina (2011–2020)
 Sanzoku Diary by Kentarō Okamoto (2011–2016)
 Narihirabashi Denki Shōten by Hisae Iwaoka (2012–2013)
 Sayonara, Tama-chan by Kazuyoshi Takeda (2012–2013)
 Kasane by Daruma Matsuura (2013–2018)
 Shōta no Sushi 2: World Stage by Daisuke Teraasawa (2013–2015)
 Inuyashiki by Hiroya Oku (2014–2017)
 Deathtopia by Yoshinobu Yamada (2014–2016)
  by Yukito Kishiro (2014–2022)
 Kaizoku to yobareta otoko by Naoki Hyakuta (story) and Souichi Moto (2014–2017)
 Kami-sama no Joker by Michiharu Kusunoki (story) and Mizu Sahara (art) (2015–2016)
  by Kou Yoneda (2016–2023)
  by Motoi Yoshida (2016–2023)
 Sanzoku Diary SS by Kentarō Okamoto (2016–2017)
 Riū wo Machinagara by Ao Akato (2017–2018)
  by Mohiro Kitoh (2017–2023)
  by Kouji Mori (2017–2023)
  by Haruka Takachiho (story) and Yu Harii (art) (2017–2023)
  by Shin Kibayashi (story) and Fumiya Satou (art) (2018–2023)
 In Hand by Ao Akato (2018–2020)
 Raw Hero by Akira Hiramoto (2018–2020)
  by Yudai Debata (2018–2023)
 Island in a Puddle by Kei Sanbe (2019–2021)

2020s 
 Gurazeni: Natsunosuke no Seishun by Yūji Moritaka (story) and Yōsuke Uzumaki (art) (2020–2022)
 Legal Egg by Homura Kawamoto (story) and Yasoko Momen (art) (2020–2021)
 A-bout! Surf by Masa Ishikawa (2021–2022)

References

External links
  
 

2001 establishments in Japan
2023 disestablishments in Japan
Biweekly magazines published in Japan
Defunct magazines published in Japan
Kodansha magazines
Magazines established in 2001
Magazines disestablished in 2023
Magazines published in Tokyo
Seinen manga magazines
Evening, Bi-weekly